Ravne na Koroškem (until 1952: Guštanj) is a town in northern Slovenia. It is the seat of the Municipality of Ravne na Koroškem, and the largest town and the capital of Slovenia's Carinthia region. The town has a long tradition in the steel industry.

Name
The name Ravne na Koroškem literally means 'Ravne in Carinthia'. The word ravne means 'flat terrain' in Slovene, and is a common place name in Slovene-inhabited territories. The name of the settlement was changed from Guštanj (from German Gutenstein) to Ravne na Koroškem in 1952 on the basis of the 1948 Law on Names of Settlements and Designations of Squares, Streets, and Buildings as part of efforts by Slovenia's postwar communist government to remove German elements from toponyms.

History
Part of the Duchy of Carinthia from 976, King Henry II of Germany granted the area to the Bishops of Bamberg in 1007. The settlement was first mentioned as Gutenstain in a 1263 deed.

Ravne na Koroškem was granted town status in 1952. The history of the steel industry in the town goes back 380 years.

Church
The parish church in the settlement is dedicated to Saint Giles and belongs to the Roman Catholic Archdiocese of Maribor. It is first mentioned in written documents dating to 1331. It was re-vaulted in the 17th century.

Culture
Ravne is also known for excellent jazz. Concerts of the Jazz Ravne cycle are held throughout the year and the Festival of Slovenian Jazz takes place each autumn.

In fiction 
One of Nostradamus's quatrains that is localized to southeast Europe has the following couplet:

which translates to 

Mario Reading translates the third line as "throughout enslaved-Slovenia," finding no other meaning and stipulates that the town will be either the conception or birthplace of the third and last Antichrist. He interprets the first lines as indicating "bad luck will come to those countries abutting the place"—Baleni Romini and Dalmatia are the specific afflicted places mentioned—and ascribes the index date 2032 based on the original manuscript number 32.  Mostly as a result of line three (the first line above) this place, the author considers Ravne na Koroškem the most likely of the three places named Ravenne in Europe that unwittingly hosts the creation of this globally inhumane person.

Gallery

References

External links

 Ravne na Koroškem on Geopedia

Populated places in the Municipality of Ravne na Koroškem
Cities and towns in Carinthia (Slovenia)